FC Yezerk, is a defunct Armenian football club from Noyemberyan, Tavush Province. The club was founded in 2006 and dissolved in 2007 due to financial difficulties and is currently inactive from professional football. Their home stadium was the Noyemberyan City Stadium (formerly known as the Central).

References

Association football clubs established in 2006
Association football clubs disestablished in 2007
Yeserk
2006 establishments in Armenia
2007 disestablishments in Armenia